Vendas Novas is a municipality in the District of Évora in Portugal. The population in 2011 was 11,846, in an area of 222.39 km2. The city has 10,235 inhabitants.

The present Mayor is Luís Dias, elected by the Socialist Party. The municipal holiday is September 7.

History

A hoard of prehistoric objects, including two trapezoid-shaped plaques with geometric designs, was found underneath a hill  by labourers in the mid nineteenth century during the construction of the railway line between Vendas Novas and Beja. They are since 1862 kept at the British Museum.

Parishes

Administratively, the municipality is divided into 2 civil parishes (freguesias):
 Landeira
 Vendas Novas

Notable people 
 Ricardo Pessoa (born 1982) a Portuguese former professional footballer with 430 club caps
 Pedro Madeira (born 1992 in Vendas Novas) a Portuguese singer.

References

External links
Town Hall official website
Photos from Vendas Novas

Cities in Portugal
Municipalities of Évora District